Libya, represented as Libyan Arab Jamahiriya, competed at the 2004 Summer Olympics in Athens, Greece, from 13 to 29 August 2004.

Athletics

Libyan athletes have so far achieved qualifying standards in the following athletics events (up to a maximum of 3 athletes in each event at the 'A' Standard, and 1 at the 'B' Standard).

Men

Women

Judo

Libya has qualified a single judoka through a tripartite invitation.

Swimming

Men

Women

Taekwondo

Libyan has qualified a single taekwondo jin. Ezedin Salem lost his first round bout when the referee ended the contest, then withdrew in his repechage match due to his physical injuries sustained from his opening bout.

Weightlifting 

Two Libyan weightlifters qualified for the following events:

See also
 Libya at the 2005 Mediterranean Games

References

External links
Official Report of the XXVIII Olympiad

Nations at the 2004 Summer Olympics
2004
Olympics